John Debra Sapong was a Ghanaian judge and barrister. He served as a Justice of the Supreme Court of Ghana from 1999 to 2000.

Biography
Sapong was born December 1929 in the Gold Coast. He was called to the bar at Lincoln's Inn. He began his judicial career as a District Magistrate in Accra. He later became a Circuit Court judge stationed in Koforidua in the 1970s. He rose through the ranks through the Appeal Court to become a Supreme Court Judge in 1999. He was nominated in 1999 and vetted on 10 March that year together with Josiah Ofori Boateng. He was approved by parliament on 30 March 1999 and was sworn in on 15 April 1999. He retired on 2 June 2000.

See also
List of judges of the Supreme Court of Ghana
Supreme Court of Ghana

References

Justices of the Supreme Court of Ghana
Date of birth unknown
20th-century Ghanaian judges
1929 births
Possibly living people